Lakhimpur  Assembly constituency is  one of the 403 constituencies of the Uttar Pradesh Legislative Assembly,  India. It is a part of the Lakhimpur  district and one of the five assembly constituencies in the Kheri Lok Sabha constituency. First election in this assembly constituency was held in 1952 after the "DPACO (1951)" (delimitation order) was passed in 1951. After the "Delimitation of Parliamentary and Assembly Constituencies Order" was passed in 2008, the constituency was assigned identification number 142.

Wards / Areas
Extent  of Lakhimpur Assembly constituency is KCs Kheri, Kheri Sri Nagar, Lakhimpur  MB, Oel Dhakhawa NP & Kheri NP of Lakhimpur Tehsil.

Members of the Legislative Assembly

16th Vidhan Sabha: 2012 General  Elections

See also

Kheri Lok Sabha constituency
Lakhimpur Kheri district
Sixteenth Legislative Assembly of Uttar Pradesh
Uttar Pradesh Legislative Assembly
Vidhan Bhawan

References

External links
 

Assembly constituencies of Uttar Pradesh
Lakhimpur, Uttar Pradesh
Constituencies established in 1951
Politics of Lakhimpur Kheri district